The 1996 Singha Thailand Open was a professional ranking snooker tournament that took place between 11 and 17 March 1996 at the Montien Riverside Hotel in Bangkok, Thailand.

Alan McManus won the tournament, defeating Ken Doherty 9–8 in the final. The defending champion, James Wattana, was eliminated by McManus in the quarter-final.


Wildcard round

Main draw

References

1996 in snooker